Alfonso Bortolotti (22 November 1911 – 17 October 2005) was an Italian sculptor. His work was part of the sculpture event in the art competition at the 1936 Summer Olympics.

References

1911 births
2005 deaths
20th-century Italian sculptors
20th-century Italian male artists
Italian male sculptors
Olympic competitors in art competitions
Artists from Bologna